Bodil Skjånes Dugstad (23 May 1927 – 6 February 2021) was a Norwegian politician for the Labour Party.

Dugstad was born in Trondheim. She served as a deputy representative to the Norwegian Parliament from Sør-Trøndelag during the term 1973–1977. From 1973 to 1975, during the second cabinet Bratteli, Dugstad was appointed State Secretary in the Ministry of Church Affairs and Education.

References

1927 births
2021 deaths
Norwegian state secretaries
Deputy members of the Storting
Labour Party (Norway) politicians
Politicians from Trondheim